Christmas in My Heart is a studio album of Christmas music recorded by Connie Francis. The album features popular songs of the season on the A-side and the sacred music of Christmas on the B-side. It was re-released as Connie's Christmas in 1966.

Background
Christmas in My Heart was recorded in August 1959 at EMI's famous Abbey Road Studios, then called EMI Recording Studios in London under the musical direction of Geoff Love and was released in November 1959.

The album was repackaged with a new cover design and re-released in October 1962. The album charted for 3 weeks peaking at #19 on Billboard'''s Christmas Records album chart on December 21, 1963.

Another repackaging and re-release followed in November 1966; this time the album was also retitled Connie's Christmas'' and received a new catalogue number: E-4399 for mono pressings and SE-4399 for stereo pressings.  A compact disc edition of the album was issued by Polydor Records in 1988, with "Baby's First Christmas" (the B-side to Francis' 1961 single "When the Boy in Your Arms (Is the Boy in Your Heart)") added as a bonus track.

Track listing

Side A

Side B

References

Connie Francis albums
1959 Christmas albums
Christmas albums by American artists
Covers albums
MGM Records albums
Pop Christmas albums